Lovesick is a Canadian romantic comedy film, released December 2, 2016. The film has a running time of 93 minutes, and was filmed in various sections of Winnipeg, Manitoba, Canada. Lovesick, was written and directed by Winnipeg filmmaker Tyson Caron, in which he made his directorial debut.

Plot 
Dash is a man obsessed with trying to win back his ex-girlfriend Lauren, even though she is now engaged to Mark. Dash enters therapy and seeks counselling from a professional psychologist in order to finally acknowledge his issues at hand. At the hospital, Dash meets Nora, a recovering alcoholic and is exposed to new feelings and is forced to confront whether he really knows what he wants. He is submerged in a constant cycle of unrequited love. He is required to decide what is best for him and make a decision that will ultimately affect the rest of his life.

Cast 
 Jacob Tierney as Dash
 Jessica Paré as Lauren
 Jay Baruchel as Mark
 Ali Tataryn as Nora
 Ross McMillan as Dr. Goldberg
 Rebecca Gibson as Bee
 Adam Brooks as Conrad
 Sarah Constible as Mary

Production 
This film was produced by the studio company "Eagle Vision" and has not been rated. Matthew Schellenberg of the band Royal Canoe wrote and recorded the film's soundtrack. At the 5th Canadian Screen Awards in 2017, he received a nomination for Best Original Song for "Draw Blood".

References

External links
 

2016 films
2016 romantic comedy films
Canadian romantic comedy films
English-language Canadian films
Films set in Winnipeg
Films shot in Winnipeg
2010s English-language films
2010s Canadian films